Gymnopilus flavifolius is a species of mushroom in the family Hymenogastraceae.

See also

List of Gymnopilus species

References

External links
Gymnopilus flavifolius at Index Fungorum

flavifolius
Taxa named by William Alphonso Murrill